Grandidierina lineata is a species of skink endemic to Madagascar.

References

Reptiles of Madagascar
Reptiles described in 1901
Grandidierina
Taxa named by François Mocquard